The Stars Look Down is a 1935 novel by A. J. Cronin which chronicles various injustices in an English coal mining community. A film version was released in 1940, and television adaptations include both Italian (1971) and British (1975) versions.

The novel is set in 'Sleescale,' a mining town on the coast of Northumberland, as well as in 'Tynecastle' (Newcastle upon Tyne). While 'Sleescale' is a fictional locale, it is based on an excellent knowledge of similar places and people. Cronin, a Scot, served as Medical Inspector of Mines in the South Wales Valleys during the 1920s.

Beginning before World War I and extending into the 1930s, the story shows the different careers of several persons: principally, a miner's son who aspires to defend his people politically, a miner who becomes a businessman, and the mine owner's son in conflict with his domineering father.

Plot summary 
The novel centres on three very different men:

 David (Davey) Fenwick comes from a mining family but is drawn towards politics, aspiring to help his people, and becomes a strong supporter of nationalisation. Initially, he finishes up his bachelor's degree and is a teacher at a school for the children of miners.
 Joe Gowlan begins as a miner, drifts and then becomes upwardly mobile as a bookie's assistant and a war-profiteer.
 Arthur Barras is the son of Richard Barras, the unscrupulous owner of the Neptune Colliery. He is unhappy with his father's values but also feels too weak to do much about it.

Reactions to the failure of industrial action on safety issues in the coal mines are crystallised in the characters of Davey and Joe, who take vastly different routes in escaping from the working class. While Davey becomes an MP to fight for nationalisation of the mines, Joe essentially joins the mine owners.

Jenny Sunley is Davey's indifferent wife who craves social status, and other characters have short but distinct tales of their own. Cronin shows a broad sympathy for the workers and a dislike of the bosses, but also allows that at least some of the bosses can be decent at a personal level.

Central to the story is the Neptune coal mine and a catastrophe that occurs there. The Great War is also a factor: do you volunteer to fight, volunteer for non-military duties, use trickery to evade service or openly defy the system by refusing call-up?  There is a brief description of one of the tribunals that examined conscientious objectors, often refusing to accept their objection as valid. There is also a clear commitment to the idea of nationalising the mines, replacing the mass of small private owners that existed at the time.

The novel ends with most of the men much changed, and it is an excellent description of working-class life in the North of England during that period.

Memorable quotes
The cage dropped. It dropped suddenly, swiftly, into the hidden darkness. And the sound of its falling rose out of that darkness like a great sigh which mounted towards the furthermost stars.

And from above, the stars look down.

Adaptations
The Stars Look Down is a 1940 film adapted from the novel. Co-scripted by Cronin and directed by Carol Reed, the film stars Michael Redgrave as the idealistic Davey Fenwick and Margaret Lockwood as his wife. Their relationship, which is secondary in the novel, is foregrounded in the film. The American release includes narration by Lionel Barrymore. It is a New York Times Critics' Pick and is listed in The New York Times Guide to the Best 1,000 Movies Ever Made.

Radiotelevisione Italiana adapted the novel as a miniseries in 1971 under the title E le stelle stanno a guardare. The dramatisation stars Orso Maria Guerrini as Davey Fenwick, Andrea Checchi as Robert Fenwick, Giancarlo Giannini as Arthur Barras and Anna Maria Guarnieri as Jenny Sunley. This version was written and directed by Anton Giulio Majano.

In 1975, Granada Television produced The Stars Look Down as a 13 episode series. This production was written by Alan Plater and directed by Roland Joffé and Alan Grint.

In 2004, North Eastern playwright Alex Ferguson adapted the novel for NTC Theatre Company. An ensemble of five actors played all the parts: Alan Park (Joe Gowlan/Arthur Barras), Ross Waiton (Davie Fenwick), Kim Evans (Jenny Sunley/Hughie Fenwick), Jackie Fielding (Martha Fenwick), and Steve Wedd (Robert Fenwick/Richard Barras). Directed by Gillian Hambleton, the play met with resounding critical success, breathing new life into Cronin's timeless tale.

References in other works

In Dorothy Sayers' Busman's Honeymoon, published the same year as Cronin's book, Lord Peter Wimsey's mother starts reading The Stars Look Down, but finds it "very depressing and preachy, and not what I expected from the title."

The opening song in Billy Elliot The Musical is titled "The Stars Look Down"; an homage to Cronin's book.

The 1954 Japanese film An Inn in Osaka (大阪の宿） shows the cover of a Japanese translation of the novel.

In William Trevor's story "The Children" contained in the collection "Cheating at Canasata" has the child reading her dead mother's copy of "The Stars Look Down" while her father attempts to remarry.

Rush’s 2002 album Vapor Trails features a song called “The Stars Look Down” based on Cronin’s novel.

References

External links 
Vermilye, Jerry. The Great British Films. Citadel Press, 1978, pp 49–51. 
Scotsman interview (2002)
The Stars Look Down at the BFI Film & TV Database

Novels by A. J. Cronin
1935 British novels
Coal mining in the United Kingdom
Novels set in Northumberland
Novels set in Newcastle upon Tyne
Victor Gollancz Ltd books
Little, Brown and Company books
British novels adapted into films
British novels adapted into television shows